Correbia meridionalis is a moth of the subfamily Arctiinae. It was described by Rothschild in 1912. It is found in Ecuador.

The wingspan is about 36 mm. The forewings are orange-scarlet with a minute blackish spot at the middle of the costa and a blackish streak on the inner margin. There is also a rounded apical black-brown patch, slightly tinged with bluish. The costa and veins are streaked with orange and the terminal area below it has slight brown streaks in the interspaces. The hindwings are brown, the lower part of the cell and the area just below it are semihyaline.

References

Euchromiina
Moths described in 1912